If Lucy Fell is a 1996 American romantic comedy film written and directed by Eric Schaeffer, who also co-stars in the film alongside Sarah Jessica Parker, Ben Stiller and Elle Macpherson. It was released on DVD January 30, 2001.

Plot
Joe MacGonaughgill (Eric Schaeffer) and Lucy Ackerman (Sarah Jessica Parker) are roommates and best friends living in a small Manhattan apartment. Lucy is turning thirty and her love life is embarrassingly dull. Joe on the other hand is infatuated  with his attractive neighbor Jane (Elle Macpherson). Lucy then decides to form a death pact with Joe like they'd had back in college. If they do not both find true love by the time Lucy turns thirty, then they will both jump off the Brooklyn Bridge.

Jane comes to an artwork show of Joe's where Joe finally gathers up the courage to ask her out, while Lucy begins dating Bwick Elias (Ben Stiller), a weirdo artist who paints with his own body parts. Joe soon realizes that Jane isn't who he thought she ought to be. Bwick also turns out to be "no Joe" for Lucy. It is at this point that Joe and Lucy realize that they are perfect for each other.

Cast
Sarah Jessica Parker as Lucy Ackerman
Eric Schaeffer as Joe MacGonauhgill
Elle Macpherson as Jane Lindquist
Ben Stiller as Bwick Elias
James Rebhorn as Simon Ackerman
Robert John Burke as Handsome Man
David Thornton as Ted
Bill Sage as Dick
Dominic Chianese as Al
Scarlett Johansson as Emily

Reception
If Lucy Fell earned mostly negative reviews from critics, holding an 18% rating on Rotten Tomatoes based on 28 reviews.

Roger Ebert of the Chicago Sun-Times, gave the film one out of four stars, writing:[Eric Schaeffer] is obviously a smart guy. Why does he play dumb? What's with the goofy blue hats he wears throughout the film? And the doofus haircut? And the self-referential dialogue? And why does he betray himself at the end with lines like "You figured out the girl in your heart isn't the girl in your dreams"? ... I'd like to see a Schaeffer movie in which he plays a guy as smart as he is; in which he takes the risk of wanting to make a good film, instead of hiding behind irony.

References

External links 
 
 
 

1996 romantic comedy films
1996 directorial debut films
1996 films
American romantic comedy films
Films set in New York City
TriStar Pictures films
1990s English-language films
Films directed by Eric Schaeffer
1990s American films